Karl Felix Eisengräber (7 March 1874, Leipzig - 29 April 1940, Munich) was a German painter.

Biography 
Felix Eisengräber began his studies at the Leipzig Academy of Art, after which he studied at the Academy of Fine Arts, Munich under Ludwig von Herterich and Paul Hoecker. After the death of Anton Ažbe, he and Paul Weinhold continued Ažbe's school of art until 1913.

After World War I, by arrangement with Springer Verlag, Eisengräber provided the illustrations for new editions of medical books by Ferdinand Sauerbruch.

References

Sources 
 Galerie von Zezschwitz

1874 births
1940 deaths
19th-century German painters
19th-century German male artists
German male painters
20th-century German painters
20th-century German male artists